Eubalichthys is a genus of filefishes found in the eastern Indian Ocean waters around Australia.

Species
There are currently 6 recognized species in this genus:
 Eubalichthys bucephalus Whitley, 1931 (Black reef leatherjacket)
 Eubalichthys caeruleoguttatus Hutchins, 1977 (Blue-spotted leatherjacket)
 Eubalichthys cyanoura Hutchins, 1987 (Bluetail leatherjacket)
 Eubalichthys gunnii Günther, 1870 (Gunn's leatherjacket)
 Eubalichthys mosaicus E. P. Ramsay & J. D. Ogilby, 1886 (Mosaic leatherjacket)
 Eubalichthys quadrispinis Hutchins, 1977 (Four-spined leatherjacket)

References

Monacanthidae
Marine fish genera
Taxa named by Gilbert Percy Whitley